Barbaro, Smarty Jones and Ruffian: The People’s Horses is a 2008 book written by Linda Hanna about thoroughbred racing.

Summary
Through the lives of these three dynamic “fan favorites,” Hanna shares all aspects of the sport as well as many pieces of personal information on Barbaro, Smarty Jones and Ruffian gathered from her research. Through exclusive interviews with owners, trainers, jockeys, equine veterinarians, pedigree specialists and racing officials, she carries fans to a new level of knowledge and appreciation.
            
Speaking from the perspective of a “fan,” Hanna educates her audience in the nuances of breeding, training and racing. The reader will be readily drawn into the “new Golden Age of Horseracing” in the ‘70s, as Ruffian makes her dramatic debut at Belmont Park and smashes track records during this brief and brilliant career. Insights from her trainer, Frank Y. Whiteley, Jr., shed new light on her devastating and fatal breakdown during The Great Match Race of 1975.
            
As Smarty Jones captivated America with his Triple Crown bid in 2004, Hanna weaves readers into the history of horseracing in his home state of Pennsylvania and the positive reverberations there caused by the “Smarty Effect.” All aspects of Smarty Jones' brief career are presented in great detail with new revelations concerning his much-criticized retirement in August 2004.  In an introduction to the book written by Smarty’s owner, Patricia L. Chapman, readers are reminded of all aspects of the sport-positive and negative. Both Chapman and Hanna speak to the need for greater rescue efforts for needy horses and to the call for greater responsibility for all within the sport. As a designated charity for a portion of the book’s proceeds, Hanna directs her readers to The Kentucky Equine Humane Center in a Preface by Staci Hancock who outlines the Center’s wonderful efforts in horse rescue and placement.
            
Another large segment of the population was drawn to Thoroughbred horseracing, as it watched Gretchen and Roy Jackson’s Barbaro struggle for survival after breaking a leg during the 2006 Preakness Stakes. With poignant detail, Hanna moves her audience through the interworkings of veterinary orthopedics at New Bolton Center, an eight-month public relations/media effort on national television and an ongoing and astounding fan base for the fallen hero, Barbaro.  Since his death in January 2007, Hanna relates that fans have united in new and far-reaching causes in his name.
            
In a final section of the book, which Hanna titles Legacy, she examines significant and timely equine topics. Some of these include: the injuries of these horses, an analysis of their pedigrees, efforts toward anti-slaughter, the need for rescue efforts, the work of the Fans of Barbaro and the legacies of these three special equine athletes. As a final kudo to fans young and old, Governor Edward G. Rendell of Pennsylvania addresses the wonderful careers of Barbaro, Smarty Jones and Ruffian in what has evolved as a feel good story about these horses’ lives.

References

2008 non-fiction books
Horse racing mass media